Mohammad Khan (also Romanized as Moḩammad Khān; also known as Pāpī Kamp) is a village in Howmeh Rural District, in the Central District of Andimeshk County, Khuzestan Province, Iran. At the 2006 census, its population was 333, in 65 families.

References 

Populated places in Andimeshk County